Love Larson (born June 11, 1978) is a Swedish make-up artist and hair stylist. He is best known for his works in Skyfall (2012), The 100-Year-Old Man Who Climbed Out the Window and Disappeared (2013), A Man Called Ove (2015), and Dune (2021). He received his first Oscar nomination Academy Award for Best Makeup and Hairstyling at the 88th Academy Awards along with Eva von Bahr.

Awards and nominations
 2022: Academy Award for Best Makeup and Hairstyling for Dune (nominated)
 2016: Academy Award for Best Makeup and Hairstyling for A Man Called Ove (nominated)
 2015: Academy Award for Best Makeup and Hairstyling for The 100-Year-Old Man Who Climbed Out the Window and Disappeared (nominated)
 2015: Guldbagge Award for Best Makeup and Hair for A Man Called Ove (won) 
 2014: Guldbagge Award for Best Makeup and Hair for The 100-Year-Old Man Who Climbed Out the Window and Disappeared (nominated) 
 2012: Saturn Award for Best Make-up for Skyfall (nominated)

See also

 List of foreign-language films nominated for Academy Awards

References

External links
 official website
 

Living people
1978 births
Swedish make-up artists
Best Makeup and Hair Guldbagge Award winners